Eric and Ernie is a 2011 British television drama film based on the early career of the British comic double-act Morecambe and Wise.  The film was produced by BBC Wales, completed in 2010, and premiered on BBC Two on 1 January 2011. It was watched by 6.65 million viewers. Since then, it has been repeated several times on Gold.

Plotline
Several years before World War II, Ernie Wiseman, a precocious and confident child performer, is signed up by influential impresario Jack Hylton. In Morecambe, pushy stage mother Sadie Bartholomew drags her slightly reluctant son Eric, an eccentric dancer, from one audition to the next until he too is employed by Hylton. At first glance the boys do not initially get on but Sadie sees a way to use their cross-talk to form a bantering double act, originally known as Bartholomew and Wise. But as time goes on, Sadie comes to the conclusion that their name is stopping them from getting noticed, so after reading the local newspaper, The Morecambe Visitor, she suggests that they should change their name to Morecambe and Wise.

After war service they become successful on stage and on radio but their attempt to crack the new medium of television is a disaster because they have been forced to accept a script which will make their Northernness acceptable to Southern viewers. As a result, the duo go their own ways and split up. However, Sadie knows that their formula will work and pushes Eric, now married to dancer Joan, into contacting Ernie, who is married to dancer Doreen. They decide to reform, and to completely rewrite their own act that would become one of the most successful performing duos ever in British comedy.

Cast
In credits order:
 Victoria Wood as Sadie Bartholomew, Eric's mother
 Daniel Rigby as Eric Morecambe
 Bryan Dick as Ernie Wise
 Jim Moir as George Bartholomew, Eric's father
 Reece Shearsmith as Harry Wiseman, Ernie's father
 Emer Kenny as Joan Bartlett, Eric's wife
 Hannah Steele as Doreen Blythe, Ernie's wife
 Josh Benson as Little Ernie
 Thomas Atkinson as Little Eric
 Thomas Aldersley as Club MC
 Ted Robbins as Jack Hylton
 Jonah Lees as Young Eric
 Harry McEntire as Young Ernie
 Ria Jones as Boarding House Landlady
 Pam Shaw as Lily
 Esmé Bianco as Naked Showgirl
 Andrew Greenough as Gordon Noval, Eric and Ernie's manager
 Marcus Taylor as Stage Door Keeper #1
 Lee Oakes as Stage Door Keeper #2
 Fine Time Fontayne as Stage Door Keeper #3
 Robert Willox as Doug, Glasgow Empire stage door keeper
 Ian Ross-Henderson as Glasgow Empire Heckler
 Julian Wadham as Ronnie Waldman
 Alex Price as Nigel, BBC writer
 Stephen Aintree as Vernon Arnold
 Martin Walsh as Fishmonger
 Angela Curran as Edna, Sadie's friend
 Peter Gunn as Billy Crackers, warm-up comedian
 Carolynne Good as Girl from Vasaria, in TV sketch
 Clara Darcy as Theatre Usherette
 Nicky P. Smalley as audience members

Filming locations
Amongst the locations used for filming include:-
 Stockport Plaza and New Mills Art Theatre for the various theatre interior shots
 O2 Apollo Manchester as Shepherd's Bush Empire for the filming of their first TV series Running Wild (1954 TV series)
 Stockport for the various outdoor shots
 Stockport Air Raid Shelters
 Morecambe
 Morecambe Winter Gardens where Ernie performed his solo tap dance routines
 East Lancashire Railway
 Victoria Baths

Awards
Daniel Rigby won the BAFTA TV Award for Best Actor at the 2011 BAFTAs for his performance as Eric Morecambe.

References

External links

TV review: Eric and Ernie on The Guardian
TV review: Eric and Ernie on The Independent

2011 television films
2011 films
BBC television dramas
British biographical films
Films scored by Ilan Eshkeri
Films set in 1938
Films set in 1940
Films set in 1941
Films set in 1942
Films set in 1943
Films set in 1946
Films set in 1954
Films set in Glasgow
Films set in Lancashire
Films set in London
Films set in Manchester
Morecambe and Wise
Biographical films about entertainers
Cultural depictions of comedians
Cultural depictions of British people
Films shot in Greater Manchester
2010s British films